"Jumper" is a song by American rock band Third Eye Blind from their eponymous debut studio album (1997). It was released to radio as the fifth and final single from the album on August 4, 1998, by Elektra Records. Frontman Stephan Jenkins is credited as the sole writer of the song, whilst production on the song was helmed by Jenkins and Eric Valentine. According to Jenkins, "Jumper" focuses on an act of suicide, with the broader message of the song being about human compassion.

The song was recorded and mixed in and around San Francisco at Toast Studios, Skywalker Ranch, H.O.S., and The Site by Valentine. An alternative rock and acoustic power pop song, "Jumper" is a lament centrally inspired by the suicide of a bullied gay teenager. However, Jenkins also was inspired by his own dysfunctional experiences when growing up. The instrumentation used in the song includes guitars, keyboards, and a piano.

"Jumper" received positive reviews from music critics. The song reached number five on the US Billboard Hot 100 and number nine on the Billboard Modern Rock Tracks chart. "Jumper" was also successful in Canada, climbing to number 10 on the RPM Top Singles chart.

Writing and inspiration

"Jumper" was written solely by frontman Stephan Jenkins. Jenkins intended to write a song about the perils of bullying, with the song's narrative focusing on a "friend who’s gay jumping off a bridge and killing themselves." This narrative was inspired by a friend of band manager Eric Godtland who committed suicide in high school due to bullying he endured for his sexuality. In an interview with SongFacts, Jenkins said that the concept of the song was further developed through his own alienating childhood experiences. Despite being written as a lament, Jenkins expressed that a broader message of "Jumper" is to have an understanding and compassion for one another. He further explained the meaning of the song:
"Jumper" is about a guy who jumped off the Coronado Bridge and killed himself. It's kind of a noir-inspired story, and the point was if we have more understanding for each other, then we might give each other credit. And if you don’t want to see me again, I'd understand. Sometimes when you really help people and you make yourself vulnerable and they can’t really see you [afterwards]. I had a friend who was raped and she needed money for medical care. and she was ashamed and couldn’t talk to her parents about it... basically, after I helped her she didn’t want to see me. She gave a bit too much of herself. I understood that.
Since the release of "Jumper," Jenkins has identified that the meaning of the song has changed for many listeners. He felt that the song's meaning was not entirely understood upon release, although "[n]ow it has this real levity. It's this huge moment of release for the audience." Lyndsey Parker from Yahoo! Entertainment designated the song as an "anti-bullying anthem," which prompted Jenkins to acknowledge that he believes "Jumper" has resonated among many LGBT listeners.

Recording and mixing
Speaking on the recording of "Jumper", Jenkins commented: "I was looking for a real thud in the drums… I wanted a thickness in midrange, so we put the drums in a smaller room and opened the doors so it had a sense of breathing. For 'Jumper,' I gave Brad — who uses these big sticks — I gave him some small sticks, and put the riser in the middle of the room and did it with no reverb, like a Beatles thing." Eric Valentine was responsible for the mixing of the track, which was made at The Site, H.O.S, and Toast Studios. Ted Jensen mastered the track at Sterling Sound Studios in New York City.

Composition
"Jumper" is an alternative rock and acoustic power pop song. According to the sheet music published at Musicnotes.com by Alfred Publishing, the song is written in the key of C major and is set in time signature of common time with a tempo of 88 beats per minute. Jenkin's vocal range spans one octave, from C4 to A5.

Critical reception
Justin Joffe of Observer referred to the song as a "catchy acoustic jangle" that addresses suicide. Mark Jenkins of The Washington Post believed the song's lyrical content of "potential suicide" tread familiar territory.

Chart performance
In the United States, "Jumper" debuted at number 16 on the Billboard Hot 100 chart for the issue dated December 5, 1998. The song spent a total of 20 weeks on the chart, peaking at number five for the issue dated January 30, 1999.

Music video

Background
The music video was directed by Yariv Gaber. As a friend of drummer Brad Hargreaves, American model Anna Nicole Smith visited the set on the day of shooting, which led to her making an appearance in the video.

Synopsis
The video primarily takes place in a crowded club and focuses on a young man who wanders in and around the surrounding area of the city; interacting with various people. Stephan Jenkins primarily sings while Kevin Cadogan is seen making out with various women, some of whom are implied to be escorts. A pregnant street walker, a promiscuous and flirtatious hustler, and a free spirited partier are those shown frequently throughout the video. Eventually, Jenkins sings directly to the young man who seems empowered by the message. As the video ends, Jenkins briefly transforms into a little boy playing a snare drum to match with the ending of the song.

Live performances
In September 2015, Jenkins joined Demi Lovato on their iHeartRadio Music Festival set for a performance of "Jumper". The song was performed at a charity concert at the Rock and Roll Hall of Fame to a crowd of 2016 Republican National Convention attendees. The band performed "Jumper" and "Non-Dairy Creamer" in protest of the Republican Party's party platform, with Jenkins speaking out in support of LGBT rights and science.

Track listings and formats
 CD, cassette, and 7-inch
 "Jumper" (radio edit) – 4:06
 "Graduate" (remix) – 3:26

Credits and personnel
Credits and personnel are adapted from the Third Eye Blind album liner notes.
 Kevin Cadogan – guitar, vocals
 Brad Hargreaves – drums
 Stephan Jenkins – writer, vocals, guitars, percussion, keyboard arrangements, producer
 Arion Salazar – bass, vocals, piano
 Eric Valentine – engineering, producer, mixing
 Ted Jensen - mastering

Charts

Weekly charts

Year-end charts

Release history

Appearances in other media

The song was featured in the 2002 HBO documentary Middle School Confessions, hosted by Samuel Jackson. 

 The song is featured in the 2008 film Yes Man, as Carl Allen (Jim Carrey) uses an acoustic serenade to try to prevent a suicidal man (Luis Guzmán) from jumping off the ledge of an apartment building. Third Eye Blind's Stephan Jenkins briefly appears in the scene as a fireman.
 A cover of the song has been recorded by BEDlight for BlueEYES featuring Sebastian Davin of Dropping Daylight for the album Punk Goes 90's. Indie-pop band Daphne Loves Derby also regularly covers this song in concert.
 This song was used for a public service announcement on Season 5, Episode 3 of MTV's Road Rules titled "The Blind Leading the Blessed."  The show  originally aired on January 26, 1998.
 This song was featured in the 2011 film 30 Minutes or Less on a mixtape made by Travis (Nick Swardson).
 This song was featured in the American Dad! episode "The Scarlet Getter".
 This song was featured in the 2011 film My Suicide.
 A remixed version entitled, "Jumper '09" was added to the Rock Band Music Store as DLC through the Rock Band Network in 2010.
 The song was sung during a skit on The Tonight Show Starring Jimmy Fallon by Jimmy Fallon and Justin Timberlake on December 16, 2014.
 This song was featured in the Comedy Central television show Workaholics episode “Faux Chella”.

See also
 List of Radio & Records number-one singles of 1998

References

1997 songs
1998 singles
American power pop songs
LGBT-related songs
Song recordings produced by Eric Valentine
Songs about suicide
Songs written by Stephan Jenkins
Third Eye Blind songs